William Beverly Lillard (January 10, 1918 – June 9, 2009) was an American professional baseball player. His older brother, Gene, also played in the Majors.

Bill Lillard started his career in the minors in 1938 with the San Francisco Seals and after hitting .335 that season, moved up to Major League Baseball playing shortstop from  through  for the Philadelphia Athletics of the American League. In a two-season Major League career, Lillard was a .244 hitter (55-for-206) with one home run and 22 RBI in 80 games, including 30 runs, nine doubles, two triples, and a .339 on-base percentage.

Lillard then served in the Pacific Theater of Operations during World War II and was wounded by a mortar round for which he received the Purple Heart Medal.

He returned to baseball for his final seasons with the New York Giants' organization, batting .269 in 1946 for their American Association team in Minneapolis.  He helped the Jersey City Giants win the International League pennant in 1947 while batting .264.
 
Lillard died in San Luis Obispo, California at the age of 91.

See also
1939 Philadelphia Athletics season
1940 Philadelphia Athletics season

External links

1918 births
2009 deaths
Baltimore Orioles (IL) players
Baseball players from California
Fort Worth Cats players
Hollywood Stars players
Jersey City Giants players
Major League Baseball shortstops
Minneapolis Millers (baseball) players
People from Goleta, California
Philadelphia Athletics players
San Diego Padres (minor league) players
San Francisco Seals (baseball) players
Toronto Maple Leafs (International League) players
Tucson Cowboys players